The Sigillum Dei (seal of God, or signum dei vivi, symbol of the living God, called by John Dee the Sigillum Dei Aemeth) is a magical diagram, composed of two circles, a pentagram, two heptagons, and one heptagram, and is labeled with the name of God and his angels. It was an amulet (amuletum) with the magical function that, according to one of the oldest sources (Liber Juratus), allowed the initiated magician to have the power to commune with angels and archangels (beatific visionary).

Middle Ages

Liber Juratus
Probably the oldest known description and image of the Sigillum Dei is the 14th Century Liber Juratus (also Liber Sacratus, Liber sacer sive Juratus, or Sworn Booke), attributed to Honorius, son of Euclid. This may have been produced in the late 13th century, but likely not before the time of Pope John XXII. (1316–1334).

The description of the seal in the Liber Juratus begins with the dimensions of the circle surrounding the outside in relation to common symbol figures of the Christian tradition.

make first a circle whose diameter is three fingers, because of the three cross-nails of the Lord, or five fingers because of the five wounds of Christ, or seven for the seven sacraments, or nine for the nine orders of angels, but usually five fingers will suffice. Then make a second within this circle, let it be a distance from the first two grains because of the two Tablets of the Law of Moses, or three grains because of the persons of the Trinity.

The so created circular band will be at an apex of a small cross and from this starting point proceed from left to right 72 Latin letters, which vary in tradition (MS Sloane 3853: h, t, o, e, x, o, r, a, b, a, s, l, a, y, q, c, i, y, s, t, a, l, g, a, a, o, n, o, s, v, l, a, r, y, c, e, k, s, p, f, y, o, m, e, n, e, a, u, a, r,
e, l, a, t, e, d, a, t, o, n, o, n, a, o, y, l, e, p, o, t, m, a), the sum forming the Shemhamphorasch, the ineffable name of God ("magnum nomen Domini Semenphoras licterarum 72"), showing a clear link to Jewish tradition.

Next to the circular band is a pentagram, which focuses on a Greek Tau, this is surrounded by the five letters of the name of God "El" and "Ely", and five other pairs of letters (lx, al, a, c, to).

Inside the pentagon, in turn, is a heptagon drawn in such a way that its top side touches the centre tip of the pentagram, and the pages of this heptagon should be labelled with the names of seven angels and archangels (Cafziel, Satquiel, Samael, Raphael, Anael, Michael, Gabriel).

From this first heptagon is a second and a third drawing, whose description is hard to understand and has been interpreted differently in the manuscript illustrations, but has usually seven key points with crosses and labelled with two rows of Gods: a first series of seven names of God, each in three syllables or components disassembled and relating spatially with those on the initial and final syllables of the last names of angels and vertices of the figure, namely la-ya- ly (to Cafziel), na-ra-th (to Satquiel), ly-bar-re (to Raphael), ly-ba-res (to Michael), (e) t-ly-alg (to Samael), ve -h-am (to Anael), and y-al-gal (to Gabriel); also in sub-segments seven more: Vos, Duynas, Gyram, Gram, Aysaram, Alpha and Omega, a third series El, On, El, On, Electric, On, Omega; as additions to the registered crosses the four letters a, g, a, l; and finally another group of five names of God Ely, Eloy, Christ, and Sother Adonay.

The colour of the seal of the Liber Juratus indicates that the pentagram is usually red, purple with yellow faces, the first heptagon blue, second yellow, the third yellow and the black circles, and also the area between the circles and all other surfaces were to turn green. In magical operations, this would be handled differently – instead drawn on virgin parchment with the blood of the mole, pigeon, hoopoe, bat or other animals, such as cattle, horses or deer.

Clavicula Salomonis
Different versions of the Sigillum Dei are known from the tradition of the Clavicula Salomonis, specifically from an Italian manuscript in the collection of Heimann Joseph Michael in the Bodleian Library (MS. Michael 276); and John Aubrey in 1674 made a copy, also in the Bodleian Library (MS. Aubrey 24).

Early modern
One of the oldest surviving manuscripts of the Liber Juratus, dating from the end of the 14th or the beginning of the 15th century, is Sloane MS 313 from the collection of Hans Sloane in the British Library. It was partly owned by the mathematician and magical experimenter John Dee, in whose Mysteriorum Libri Quinti, or Five books of mystical exercises (1581–1583), the Sigillum Dei played a central role and gained the suffix Sigillum Dei: Emeth or Aemeth ("Truth").

For John Dee, who received the authoritative description of the seal in 1582 via his medium and employee Edward Kelley, this scholarly and antiquarian interest was ultimately subordinate to the purpose of practical application. This can be contrasted with Athanasius Kircher, who devoted a detailed explanation to the Sigillum Dei in his Oedipus aegyptiacus, who linked the rejection of magical practice with a scholarly effort to understand the Christian, Jewish, Arab-Muslim and pagan parts and separate them.

See also
Sigil (magic)

Further reading
 Colin D. Campbell. "The Sigillum Dei: Aemeth" in Joseph Thiebes and Richard Kaczynski (eds) Unity Uttermost Showed! Proceedings of the Seventh Biennial National Ordo Templi Orientis Conference, Seattle, Washington August 7–9, 2009 e.v. Riverside, CA: Ordo Templi Orientis USA Supreme Grand Council, 2011, pp. 85–92.
 Colin D. Campbell. The Magic Seal of Dr John Dee: The Sigillum Dei Aemeth. Teitan Press, 2009.

References

Magic symbols